Charles Leslie Wrenn (1895–1969) was an English scholar. After taking an MA at the University of Oxford, he worked for a year as a lecturer in the department of English Language and Literature at the University of Leeds in 1928–29. Following his return to Oxford, he became Rawlinson and Bosworth Professor of Anglo-Saxon in 1945, the successor in the chair of J.R.R. Tolkien, and held the position until 1963. Wrenn was a Fellow of Pembroke College, Oxford. He was also a member of the Oxford literary discussion group known as the "Inklings", which included C. S. Lewis and Tolkien, and met for nearly two decades between the early 1930s and late 1949. Some of the work published by Wrenn includes The English Language (1949), A Study of Old English Literature (1967), and An Old English Grammar, written with Randolph Quirk (1955, rev. 1957). His literary interests were primarily comparative literature and later poets including T. S. Eliot.

Selected writings
The English Language; by C. L. Wrenn. London: Methuen, 1949
Beowulf, with the Finnesburg fragment; edited by C. L. Wrenn. London: George G. Harrap & Co., 1953. Rev. & enlarged ed. (=2nd ed.) London: Harrap, 1958. 3rd ed.; fully revised by W. F. Bolton. London: Harrap, 1973. ISBN 0245509941. (The latter was reissued by the University of Exeter in 1988.)
An Old English Grammar; by Randolph Quirk and C. L. Wrenn. London: Methuen, 1955
English and Medieval Studies Presented to J. R. R. Tolkien on the Occasion of His Seventieth Birthday; edited by Norman Davis and C. L. Wrenn. London: Allen and Unwin, 1962

References

External links
Photographs of C. L. Wrenn at the National Portrait Gallery
 Charles Leslie Wrenn Books, Alibris
 Publications by C. L. Wrenn listed in Copac
 

1895 births
1969 deaths
Anglo-Saxon studies scholars
Linguists from England
English non-fiction writers
Fellows of Pembroke College, Oxford
Inklings
Rawlinson and Bosworth Professors of Anglo-Saxon
English male non-fiction writers